Going Nowhere Fast is the eighth studio album by psychedelic folk band The Holy Modal Rounders, released in 1981 through Rounder Records. It was recorded as a duo and credited as Stampfel & Weber.

Track listing

Personnel 
The Holy Modal Rounders
Peter Stampfel
Steve Weber

References 

1981 albums
The Holy Modal Rounders albums
Rounder Records albums